The Fathers is a conceptual and performative work of critical and biographical content by artist Abel Azcona. The Fathers was first performed in 2016 in Madrid with the final performance, also in Madrid, in 2017 in an exhibition format. The durational piece included dozens of female survivors of prostitution who gave a physical description of their last client. On the other side of a ten-meter-long table, composite artists listened to them and drew images of the clients. The performance generated dozens of portraits which, at the closing of the work in 2017, were exhibited with the premise that any of them could be Azcona's father. The biographical work creates a critical discourse with prostitution and its inheritance, and in the case of Azcona himself, of an unknown father, having been conceived during an act of prostitution. 

Azcona's works push his body to the limit and are usually related to social issues. Azcona states that within his works he pursues an end beyond the purely aesthetic. His intent with his works is to question the viewer and force them to react, making his own body the representation of critical and political subjects. The themes of most of his performances are mostly autobiographical and focused on issues such as abandonment, violence, abuse, child abuse, mental illness, deprivation of liberty, prostitution, life and death.

See also 

 Performance Art
 Installation
 Endurance art
 Prostitution

References

Bibliography 	
 		
 

Performances